The Starý Smokovec–Hrebienok funicular is a funicular between Starý Smokovec and the tourist complex at the summit of Hrebienok in the High Tatras, Slovakia.

History 
The first rolling stock for the funicular was ordered from the legendary Ganz Works by Matejka és Kriger (Matejka Vince and Kriger Vilmos), a company based in Poprad (then part of Hungary, within Austria-Hungary). After several years of preparations, the first tourist passengers travelled by funicular on 20 December 1908. The funicular operated on the original track until 1967.

Great reconstruction of the line took place in 1967. New technology for the entire line was provided by the Italian Ceretti-Tanfani company. The passenger capacity of the new funicular cars increased from 45 to 130 passengers. With the implementation of then up-to-date technology, the duration of a one-way ride on the route decreased from 11 to 7 minutes.

The 1960s rolling stock was replaced with brand new vehicles in November 2007. New rolling stocks were made by Garaventa, a company based in Bern, Switzerland. Doppelmayr, an Austrian company helped in the creation of the new funicular, which has a capacity of 160 person, 30 more  than the older one.

Operation 
The line has the following parameters:

References

External links 

 

Funicular railways in Slovakia
High Tatras
Metre gauge railways in Slovakia
Passenger rail transport in Slovakia